Saint-Chéron may refer to:

 Saint-Chéron, Marne, a commune of the Champagne-Ardenne region of France
 Saint-Chéron, Essonne, a commune of the Île-de-France region